Moberly Correctional Center is a Missouri Department of Corrections state prison for men located in Moberly, Randolph County, Missouri.  According to the official Official Manual State of Missouri the facility has a capacity of 1800 medium- and minimum-security prisoners.

The facility opened in January 1963, built from a design by St. Louis architect Marcel Boulicault.

In July 1983 a correctional officer named Thomas Jackson was stabbed to death as he attempted to remove several inmates intoxicated on homemade wine.  One of his three attackers, Roy Michael Roberts, was executed by the state in 1999.  Another, Robert Driscoll, was also sentenced to die at one point, but after appeals that reached United States Court of Appeals for the Eighth Circuit had his sentence reduced and was released in March 2004.

In May 2013 former Moberly inmate Anthony Johnson was indicted on federal identity theft charges for stealing $80,000 through telephone fraud from within the prison, then depositing the proceeds into inmates' prison accounts.

References

Prisons in Missouri
Buildings and structures in Randolph County, Missouri
1963 establishments in Missouri